The Indonesia Open is the national open golf championship of Indonesia, and traditionally held in the capital, Jakarta.

History
The Indonesia Open was founded in 1974 as an event on the Asia Golf Circuit. It remained on the circuit until the end of the 1996 season, after which it joined the rival Asian PGA's Omega Tour for the 1997 season.

Having not been held between 1998 and 2004, the Indonesian Open returned in 2005 as a co-sanctioned event on both the Asian Tour and the European Tour. It remained a fixture on the tours through the 2009 season after which it joined the rival OneAsia tour. In 2012 it was the opening event of that tour's calendar and was also an unofficial event on the Japan Golf Tour. In 2013, it returned to the Asian Tour and moved from March to late November/early December.

In 2005, Thaworn Wiratchant recorded what would have been the record lowest aggregate score on the European Tour with 255 strokes. However, this record is not considered official as preferred lies were in operation throughout the week.

Winners

List of sponsors
Astro (2007–08)
BNI-Maybank (2007–08, 2012–13, 2017)
Bank Rakyat Indonesia (2014–2021)
Bank Mandiri (2017, 2022–present)
Carlsberg (1974–2006, 2009–11)
Enjoy Jakarta (2005–13)
HSBC (2006)
JCB (2016)
Standard Chartered (2005)

Notes

References

External links
Coverage on the Asian Tour's official site
Coverage on the European Tour's official site

Golf tournaments in Indonesia
Asia Golf Circuit events
Asian Tour events
Former European Tour events
Recurring sporting events established in 1974